Leszno may refer to the following places:
Leszno in Greater Poland Voivodeship (west-central Poland)
Leszno, Kutno County in Łódź Voivodeship (central Poland)
Leszno, Łęczyca County in Łódź Voivodeship (central Poland)
Leszno, Subcarpathian Voivodeship (south-east Poland)
Leszno, Przasnysz County in Masovian Voivodeship (east-central Poland)
Leszno, Warsaw West County in Masovian Voivodeship (east-central Poland)
Leszno, Kartuzy County in Pomeranian Voivodeship (north Poland)
Leszno, Warmian-Masurian Voivodeship (north Poland)